Ruth Klüger (30 October 1931 – 5 October 2020) was Professor Emerita of German Studies at the University of California, Irvine and a Holocaust survivor. She was the author of the bestseller weiter leben: Eine Jugend about her childhood in Nazi Germany.

Biography
Ruth Klüger was born on 30 October 1931 in Vienna. In March 1938, Hitler marched into Vienna. The annexation of Austria by the Nazis deeply affected Klüger's life: Klüger, who then was only six years old, had to change schools frequently and grew up in an increasingly hostile and antisemitic environment. Her father, who was a Jewish gynaecologist, lost his practitioner's license and was later sent to prison for performing an illegal abortion.

In September 1942, she was deported to Theresienstadt concentration camp at the age of 10, together with her mother; her father had tried to flee abroad, but was detained and murdered. One year later she was transferred to Auschwitz, then to Christianstadt, a subcamp of Gross-Rosen. Following the end of World War II in 1945 she settled in the Bavarian town of Straubing and later studied philosophy and history at the Philosophisch-theologische Hochschule in Regensburg.

In 1947 she emigrated to the United States and studied English literature at Hunter College and German literature at the University of California, Berkeley. Klüger obtained an M.A. in 1952, and later a Ph.D. in 1967. She worked as a college professor of German literature in Cleveland, Kansas, and Virginia, and at Princeton and UC Irvine.

Klüger was a recognized authority on German literature, and especially on Lessing and Kleist. She lived in Irvine, California and in Göttingen.

Her memoir, Still Alive, which focuses primarily on her time in concentration camps, is strongly critical of the museum culture surrounding the Holocaust.

Klüger died on 5 October 2020, aged 88, 25 days before she would have turned 89 in her home in Irvine, California. She was buried at Mount Sinai Memorial Park Cemetery.

Bibliography
Publications include:
 Weiter leben. Eine Jugend, Göttingen 1992
 Katastrophen. Über die deutsche Literatur, Göttingen 1993
 Von hoher und niederer Literatur, Göttingen 1995
 Knigges Umgang mit Menschen, "Eine Vorlesung", Göttingen 1996
 Frauen lesen anders, Munich 1996
 Still Alive: A Holocaust Girlhood Remembered, New York: The Feminist Press, 2001 (English translation of weiter leben. Eine Jugend); issued in Great Britain in 2003 (London: Bloomsbury Publishing) under the title Landscapes of Memory
 unterwegs verloren. Erinnerungen, Wien, Paul Zsolnay 2008

She also published under the name Ruth Angress.

Prizes
Klüger was awarded many prizes, including:

 Rauris Literature Prize (1993)
  (1993)
 Niedersachsenpreis (1993)
 Marie Luise Kaschnitz Prize (1995)
 Andreas Gryphius Prize, honorary prize (1996)
 Heinrich-Heine-Medaille (1997)
 Österreichischer  (1998)
 Prix de la Shoah (1998)
 Thomas Mann Prize (1999)
 Preis der Frankfurter Anthologie (1999)
 Goethe Medal (2005)
 Roswitha Prize (2006)
 Lessing Prize of the Free State of Saxony (2007)
  (2008)
  (2010)
 Austrian Danubius Donauland Nonfiction Book Prize (de) (2010), for her life's work
  (2011)

References

1931 births
2020 deaths
Austrian women writers
Jewish Austrian writers
Theresienstadt Ghetto survivors
Auschwitz concentration camp survivors
Gross-Rosen concentration camp survivors
University of California, Irvine faculty
Literary critics of German
Writers from Vienna